"The Distance" is a song by American singer-songwriter Mariah Carey featuring singer Ty Dolla Sign. It was released by Epic Records on October 18, 2018, as the second promotional single from Carey's fifteenth studio album Caution. It was included with the pre-order of the record. A lyric video was released on November 16, 2018, along with its parent album's release. "The Distance" was written by Carey, Tyrone Griffin Jr., Sonny Moore, Jason Boyd and Peder Losnegård, with the latter three also producing the song.

The song is described as being "sleek, slow funk", with Carey speaking out against the detractors who doubted her relationship with her lover would "go the distance", setting the song during the "warm days" and "cold nights" of "late October". The song received positive reviews from critics and charted at number 13 on the US R&B Digital Songs chart.

Critical reception 
Slant Magazine called the song "the album’s most radio-friendly offering so far". Rolling Stone mentioned that the song "boasts a triumphant R&B vibe". In 2020, Billboard ranked it as the 92nd greatest song of Carey's career.

Background and release 
The song was announced along with the pre-order of Caution. Carey and Ty Dolla Sign performed the song on The Tonight Show Starring Jimmy Fallon on November 16, 2018. She also performed the song on the seventh leg (or second European leg) of Carey's All I Want for Christmas Is You concert residency in December 2018.

Charts

Weekly charts

Release history

References

2018 songs
Mariah Carey songs
Songs written by Mariah Carey
Songs written by Poo Bear
Songs written by Skrillex
Songs written by Ty Dolla Sign
Songs written by Lido (musician)